Opisthoncus is a genus of South Pacific jumping spiders that was first described by Ludwig Carl Christian Koch in 1880. There are still many Australian species that have not yet been described.

Species
 it contains thirty-two species, found only in Papua New Guinea and Australia:
Opisthoncus abnormis L. Koch, 1881 – Australia (Queensland, New South Wales)
Opisthoncus albiventris L. Koch, 1881 – Australia (New South Wales)
Opisthoncus alborufescens L. Koch, 1880 – Australia (Queensland, New South Wales)
Opisthoncus barbipalpis (Keyserling, 1882) – Australia (Queensland)
Opisthoncus bellus (Karsch, 1878) – Australia (New South Wales)
Opisthoncus bitaeniatus L. Koch, 1880 – Australia (Queensland, New South Wales)
Opisthoncus confinis L. Koch, 1881 – Australia (Queensland)
Opisthoncus delectabilis Rainbow, 1920 – Australia (Lord Howe Is.)
Opisthoncus devexus Simon, 1909 – Australia (Western Australia)
Opisthoncus eriognathus (Thorell, 1881) – New Guinea
Opisthoncus grassator Keyserling, 1883 – Australia (Queensland)
Opisthoncus inconspicuus (Thorell, 1881) – New Guinea
Opisthoncus keyserlingi Zabka, 1991 – Australia (New South Wales)
Opisthoncus kochi Zabka, 1991 – Australia (New South Wales)
Opisthoncus lineativentris L. Koch, 1880 – Australia (Queensland, New South Wales)
Opisthoncus machaerodus Simon, 1909 – Australia (Western Australia)
Opisthoncus magnidens L. Koch, 1880 – Australia (Queensland, New South Wales)
Opisthoncus mandibularis L. Koch, 1880 – Australia (New South Wales)
Opisthoncus mordax L. Koch, 1880 – Australia (New South Wales)
Opisthoncus necator L. Koch, 1881 – New Guinea, Australia (Queensland, New South Wales)
Opisthoncus nigrifemur Strand, 1911 – Papua New Guinea (New Britain)
Opisthoncus nigrofemoratus (L. Koch, 1867) – Australia (Queensland)
Opisthoncus pallidulus L. Koch, 1880 – Australia (New South Wales)
Opisthoncus parcedentatus L. Koch, 1880 – Australia (Queensland, New South Wales)
Opisthoncus polyphemus (L. Koch, 1867) (type) – New Guinea, Australia (Queensland, New South Wales)
Opisthoncus quadratarius (L. Koch, 1867) – Australia (Queensland)
Opisthoncus rubriceps (Thorell, 1881) – Australia (Queensland)
Opisthoncus serratofasciatus L. Koch, 1881 – Australia (New South Wales)
Opisthoncus sexmaculatus (C. L. Koch, 1846) – Australia (New South Wales)
Opisthoncus tenuipes (Keyserling, 1882) – Australia (Queensland)
Opisthoncus unicolor L. Koch, 1881 – Australia (Queensland)
Opisthoncus versimilis Peckham & Peckham, 1901 – Australia (Victoria)

References

External links
 Biting Jumping Spider – Opisthoncus mordax (photographs, description)
 Garden Jumping Spider – Opisthoncus sp. (photographs, description)

Salticidae genera
Salticidae
Spiders of Australia
Taxa named by Ludwig Carl Christian Koch